Adermatoglyphia is an extremely rare genetic disorder that prevents the development of fingerprints. Five extended families worldwide are known to be affected by this condition.

The disorder was informally nicknamed "immigration delay disease" by Professor Peter Itin after his first patient had trouble traveling to the U.S. without any fingerprints for identification.



Case study 
In 2007 an isolated finding was published regarding the description of a person from Switzerland who lacked fingerprints. The phenotype was mapped to chromosome 4q22. In the splice-site of a 3' exon of the gene for SMARCAD1-helicase, a point mutation was detected. It results in a shortened form of the skin-specific protein. The heterozygous expression of the mutation suggests an autosomal dominant mode of inheritance. The Swiss patient, and eight of her relatives who also had the mutation, all had "flat finger pads and a reduced number of sweat glands in the hands".

Other conditions can cause a lack of fingerprints, but unlike them, adermatoglyphia has no side effects.

References

External links 
 

Autosomal dominant disorders
Cutaneous congenital anomalies
 Rare diseases
Fingerprints